Karel Ťoupalík is a former Czechoslovak slalom canoeist who competed from the late 1970s to the mid-1980s. He won two medals in the C-1 team event at the ICF Canoe Slalom World Championships with a silver in 1983 and a bronze in 1979.

References

External links 
 Karel TOUPALIK at CanoeSlalom.net

Czechoslovak male canoeists
Living people
Year of birth missing (living people)
Medalists at the ICF Canoe Slalom World Championships